Peadar Ó Doirnín (c. 1700 - 1769), also known in English as Peter O'Dornin, was an Irish schoolteacher, Irish language poet and songwriter who spent much of his life in south-east Ulster.

Biography
Ó Doirnín was born c.1700 possibly near Dundalk in County Louth. He was a teacher and the master of a number of hedge schools in Counties Louth and Armagh. He died at Forkill in 1769 and his elegy was composed by fellow poet Art Mac Cumhaigh. Ó Doirnín is buried in Urnaí graveyard in north County Louth. The Forkhill Peadar Ó Doirnín GAA club was named to commemorate the poet.

Works
As a poet, and along with Art Mac Cumhaigh, Cathal Buí Mac Giolla Ghunna and Séamas Dall Mac Cuarta, Ó Doirnín was part of the Airgíalla tradition of poetry and song. His poetry and writings were recorded in the 19th and 20th centuries.

One of his poems, Mná na hÉireann, was set to an air composed by Seán Ó Riada and recorded by a number of 20th century artists including Kate Bush and Sinéad O'Connor. Other songs, such as Úrchnoc Chéin mhic Cáinte, make classic Gaelic appeals for a return to the solitude of nature.

Reputedly, due to the sexual inferences of Úrchnoc Chéin mhic Cáinte, Ó Doirnín was removed from one of his teaching jobs. Other poems by Ó Doirnín are described (for example in his Dictionary of Irish Biography entry) as humorous, bawdy and satirical, sometimes targeting other poets, priests and fellow teachers.

Collections

See also
 Séamus Mór Mac Murphy
 Piaras Feiritéar
 Dáibhí Ó Bruadair
 Aogán Ó Rathaille
 Seán Clárach Mac Dónaill
 Eoghan Rua Ó Súilleabháin

References

1700 births
1769 deaths
Irish poets
Irish Jacobites
Irish-language poets
Place of birth missing
History of literature
18th-century Irish people